Samir Chakrabarti (30 September 1943 – 11 December 2015) was an Indian cricketer. He played first-class cricket for Bengal, Railways and Services.

See also
 List of Bengal cricketers

References

External links
 
 

1943 births
2015 deaths
Indian cricketers
Bengal cricketers
Railways cricketers
Services cricketers
Cricketers from Kolkata